Winona Closterman (September 15, 1877 in Cincinnati, Ohio – July 23, 1944) was an American female tennis player.

Career
She reached the finals in the doubles at the U.S. National Championships in 1902 with Maud Banks.

At the international tennis tournament in Cincinnati, she made 14 finals appearances, winning singles titles in 1901 and 1903, a doubles title in 1903, and mixed doubles titles in 1899, 1902 and 1904. She also reached two singles finals (1902 and 1904), five other doubles finals (1899–1902 and 1904), and one other mixed doubles final (1903) at Cincinnati. In 1901, she beat two future "International Tennis Hall of Famers" players en route to the singles title. The first was 1899 U.S. singles champ Marion Jones of Nevada in the semifinals (whom she beat 7–5, 6–0) and Juliette Atkinson in the final, whom she beat in straight sets in the best-of-five format, 6–2, 8–6, 6–1.

At the Western Tennis Championships in Chicago, Closterman won the 1906 singles title (defeating Miriam Steever in the final), and reached three additional singles finals: 1901, 1903 and 1907. She lost the 1901 final and the 1903 final to McAteer, and the 1907 final to Carrie Neely.

At the Southern Women's Tennis Championship, she was a singles finalist in 1901.

Grand Slam finals

Doubles (1 runner-up)

References

 From Club Court to Center Court by Phillip S. Smith (2008 Edition; ISBN 978-0-9712445-7-3)

1877 births
1944 deaths
19th-century American women
19th-century female tennis players
American female tennis players
Tennis players from Cincinnati